Ischnocanaba is a monotypic moth of the Heliozelidae family described by John David Bradley in 1961. Its only species, Ischnocanaba euryzona, described by the same author in the same year, is found on Guadalcanal.

References

Heliozelidae
Monotypic moth genera
Moths of Oceania